Zeke Manyika (born 23 February 1955 Federation of Rhodesia and Nyasaland) is a drummer, vocalist and songwriter.

Career
Manyika was born in Zimbabwe, but has lived in Britain for most of his life. From 1982 to 1984 he was a member of the pop group Orange Juice, and contributed to their biggest hit single, "Rip It Up". He can also be heard playing drums on singles by The Style Council such as "Speak Like a Child" and "A Solid Bond in Your Heart".  He also contributed to several albums by The The including: Soul Mining, Infected and Dusk.

Manyika's solo albums to date include: "Call and Response" released by Polydor and Mastercrime released in 1989. The music video for his single "Bible Belt" was filmed in Mozambique and won the Golden Circle Award.

Manyika is mentioned several times in The Guinness Who's Who of Indie and New Wave edited by Colin Larkin, and published in 1992.  Manyika is described as providing "organic backing" to live extravaganzas organised by the UK band Botany 500 as well as playing drums on Hope and Despair the debut solo album by Edwyn Collins (released in 1989 on Demon Records). Manyika also contributed backing vocals, percussion, and toured with Paul Weller (released on Go! Discs Records in 1992).

Zeke works with Faze Action and has supplied Vocals for their releases: "Kariba", "Got to Find a Away" and "To Love is To Grow" all from the Faze Action LP "Moving Cities" which was released on (Nuphonic) in 1999.
He also recently performed Vocals on Faze Action "Echoes of Your Mind" taken from their last LP "Body of One." He has just completed work on another Single with Faze Action due out in March 2016.

References

External links
Manyika at discogs.com

1955 births
Living people
Rock drummers
Zimbabwean musicians
Some Bizzare Records artists